Mannahouse Christian Academy (formerly City Christian Schools) is a private preK-12th grade Christian school located in both Portland, Oregon and Vancouver, Washington. It is associated with Mannahouse. The campus is adjacent to Mannahouse, formerly City Bible Church, atop Rocky Butte in northeast Portland and connected to the Mill Plain Campus in Vancouver, Washington. The school is accredited with AdvancED.

References

1974 establishments in Oregon
Christian schools in Oregon
High schools in Portland, Oregon
Educational institutions established in 1974
Private high schools in Oregon
Private middle schools in Oregon
Private elementary schools in Oregon